William Pierrepont, 4th Earl of Kingston-upon-Hull (c. 1662 – 17 September 1690) was a British peer and Member of Parliament.

The second son of Robert Pierrepont of Thoresby Nottinghamshire and his wife Elizabeth Evelyn, Pierrepont was born on the Evelyn estate of West Dean, Wiltshire. He was educated at Trinity College, Oxford.

He inherited the Earldom of Kingston-upon-Hull in June 1682 from his elder brother Robert Pierrepont, 3rd Earl of Kingston-upon-Hull.

In 1689 and 1690 he acted as Colonel of a Regiment of Foot, Lord Lieutenant of Nottinghamshire and Lord Lieutenant of the East Riding of Yorkshire, Chief Justice in Eyre North of the Trent, and High Steward of Kingston-upon-Hull.

He died in 1690 of apoplexy at Holme Pierrepont, and was succeeded as 5th Earl by his younger brother Evelyn Pierrepont.

External links
  Biography of William Pierrepont, 4th Earl of Kingston-upon-Hull (c.1662-1690) - The University of Nottingham

References

|-

|-

1662 births
1690 deaths
Lord-Lieutenants of Nottinghamshire
Lord-Lieutenants of the East Riding of Yorkshire
William
Earls of Kingston-upon-Hull